Graham Heal (16 February 1945 – 16 September 2018) was an Australian rules footballer who played with North Melbourne in the Victorian Football League (VFL).

Notes

External links 

1945 births
Australian rules footballers from Western Australia
North Melbourne Football Club players
Subiaco Football Club players
2018 deaths